In discrete geometry, the original orchard-planting problem asks for the maximum number of 3-point lines attainable by a configuration of a specific number of points in the plane.  It is also called the tree-planting problem or simply the orchard problem. There are also investigations into how many k-point lines there can be. Hallard T. Croft and Paul Erdős proved 
tk > c n2 / k3, where n is the number of points and tk is the number of k-point lines. 
Their construction contains some m-point lines, where m > k. One can also ask the question if these are not allowed.

Integer sequence
Define t3orchard(n) to be the  maximum number of 3-point lines attainable with a configuration of n points. 
For an arbitrary number of points, n,  t3orchard(n) was shown to be  (1/6)n2 − O(n) in 1974.

The first few values of t3orchard(n) are given in the following table .

Upper and lower bounds
Since no two lines may share two distinct points, a trivial upper-bound for the number of 3-point lines determined by n points is

Using the fact that  the number of 2-point lines is at least 6n/13 , this upper bound can be lowered to

Lower bounds for t3orchard(n) are given by constructions for sets of points with many 3-point lines. The earliest quadratic lower bound of ~(1/8)n2 was given by Sylvester, who placed n points on the cubic curve y = x3. An elementary construction using hypocycloids was found by  achieving the same lower bound.

In September 2013, Ben Green and Terence Tao published a paper in which they prove that for all point sets of sufficient size, n > n0, there are at most ([n(n - 3)/6]  + 1) =  [(1/6)n2 − (1/2)n + 1] 3-point lines which matches the lower bound established by Burr, Grünbaum and Sloane. Thus, for sufficiently large n, the exact value of t3orchard(n) is known.

This is slightly better than the bound that would directly follow from their tight lower bound of n/2 for the number of 2-point lines: [n(n − 2)/6], proved in the same paper and solving a 1951 problem posed independently by  Gabriel Andrew Dirac and Theodore Motzkin

Orchard-planting problem has also been considered over finite fields. In this version of the problem, the n points lie in a projective plane defined over a finite field..

Notes

References
 .
 .
 .
 .

External links
 

Discrete geometry
Euclidean plane geometry
Mathematical problems
Dot patterns